Il Campionato dei Campioni  is a Sports talk and debate television program produced by Odeon TV and aired on various affiliated local television channels in Italy,  entirely devoted to Italian Soccer, in particular the Serie A.

Commentators and Presenters

Actual commentators and presenters
Stefano Peduzzi
Caterina Collovati
Andrea Eusebio
 Fulvio Collovati 
 Tony Damascelli
 Giancarlo Besana
 Carlo Pellegatti
 Massimo Buscemi
 Andrea Biavardi
 Stefano Eranio
 Alessandro Scanziani
 Paolo Monelli
 Furio Fedele
 Enzo Bucchioni
 Marco Civoli
 Giovanni Lodetti
 Emiliano Nitti
 Nicola Balzani
 Roberto Galia
Carlo Tagliagambe

References

External links

Youtube
Facebook
Web site

Italian sports television series